Kahiem Seawright (born December 17, 1986) is an American professional basketball player for Akhisar Belediyespor of the Turkish Basketball First League. He played college basketball for University of Rhode Island.

Career
Seawright played for Rhode Island Rams from 2005 to 2009, in the Atlantic 10 Conference of the Division I (NCAA).

After this time at the NCAA, started his professional career on 2009 at CB Tarragona, team of the LEB Oro, Spanish second league. One season later, signs for Baloncesto León, and becomes the most valuated foreign player of that league.

On 2011, signs for CB Valladolid and debuts at the top Spanish basketball league, the Liga ACB.

On August 8, 2018, Seawright signed a one-year deal with the Israeli team Hapoel Afula of the Israeli National League. In 23 games played for Afula, he averaged a double-double of 18.2 points and 11.2 rebounds per game.

On August 15, 2019, he has signed with Akhisar Belediyespor of the Turkish Basketball First League.

References

External links
Kahiem Seawright at ACB.com
Kahiem Seawright at FEB.es
Kahiem Seawright at CB Valladolid
Rhode Island Rams profile

1986 births
Living people
American expatriate basketball people in Argentina
American expatriate basketball people in Israel
American expatriate basketball people in Spain
American expatriate basketball people in Turkey
American expatriate basketball people in Venezuela
American men's basketball players
Antalya Büyükşehir Belediyesi players
Baloncesto León players
Basketball players from New York (state)
Büyükçekmece Basketbol players
CB Tarragona players
CB Valladolid players
Gimnasia y Esgrima de Comodoro Rivadavia basketball players
Hapoel Afula players
Liga ACB players
People from Uniondale, New York
Power forwards (basketball)
Rhode Island Rams men's basketball players
Sportspeople from Nassau County, New York
Trotamundos B.B.C. players